John Clark Donatelli (born November 22, 1965) is an American former professional ice hockey player and is the former head coach of the AHL's Wilkes-Barre/Scranton Penguins.  Donatelli was a long-time minor league player in the American Hockey League (AHL) and International Hockey League (IHL). He played 35 games in the National Hockey League (NHL). Internationally Donatelli played for the American national team at several World Championships, the 1988 and 1992 Winter Olympics.

Playing career
Donatelli was drafted in the fifth round, 98th overall, in the 1984 NHL Entry Draft by the New York Rangers. After three seasons with Boston University and one with the U.S. national team, Donatelli made his NHL debut with the Minnesota North Stars during the 1989–90 season.

Donatelli played a full season with the International Hockey League's San Diego Gulls in 1990–91, and joined the NHL's Boston Bruins briefly in the 1991–92 season.  After several seasons in the IHL and American Hockey League, as well as one in Roller Hockey International with the San Diego Barracudas, Donatelli retired in 1996.

Coaching career
After retiring, Donatelli took up coaching and eventually was named head coach of the Wheeling Nailers in the ECHL during the 2011–12 season. During the 2015–16 season, the Nailers' American Hockey League affiliate Wilkes-Barre/Scranton Penguins promoted him as the interim head coach as their head coach, Mike Sullivan, had been promoted to Pittsburgh Penguins. He became the permanent head coach of the WBS Penguins after the season ended. On June 28, 2019, it  was announced that Donatelli had resigned from his position as head coach of the WBS Penguins due to personal reasons, including alleged sexual assault of Erin Skalde, the wife of his assistant coach Jarrod Skalde. Donatelli had a record of 154–94–20–9 with Wilkes-Barre/Scranton, leading the Penguins to three Calder Cup Playoff appearances and a regular season title in 2016–17.

Sexual assault allegation
In a lawsuit filed on November 3, 2020, former  Wilkes-Barre/Scranton Penguins' assistant coach Jarrod Skalde alleged that Donatelli, who was his boss at the time, sexually assaulted his wife Erin during a team road trip in Providence, Rhode Island on November 11, 2018. According to the lawsuit, Donatelli pulled Erin closer and called her "sexy" in a restaurant after her husband left for the bathroom. When asked to stop, Donatelli allegedly instead reached under her clothing and began touching her breasts. On the car ride home, Donatelli insisted that Jarrod sit in the front seat while he sat in the back with Erin. Donatelli then allegedly began touching her breasts again, while also reaching into her pants to touch her vagina. After his wife told him what had happened, Jarrod Skalde confronted his boss on May 15, 2019, according to the lawsuit. Donatelli claimed he was too drunk to remember what he had done, but later apologized to the Skaldes for his behaviour. According to the lawsuit, "Donatelli pledged to Mr. and Mrs. Skalde that he would change his ways, seek help, and come forward to the Penguins' assistant general manager Billy Guerin about what he had done." Donatelli subsequently failed to honour his promise to tell Guerin about the incident, and Jarrod Skalde then reported the sexual assault to Guerin himself during the 2019 NHL Entry Draft in Vancouver.

According to the lawsuit, at no time did the Penguins' organization ever contact Erin to interview her about the assault, and no apology or expression of remorse or support was ever offered to the Skaldes. Guerin later informed Jarrod Skalde that the story needed to be suppressed, saying the allegation "has to stay quiet and can't be let out". The lawsuit further alleges that an investigation revealed "countless other episodes of inappropriate conduct by Mr. Donatelli, sexual and otherwise, which apparently the Penguins were aware of but did little or nothing to stop." Subsequently, a separate investigation was launched into Guerin's attempts to cover up the sexual assault.

Career statistics

Regular season and playoffs

International

Awards and honors

References

External links
 

1965 births
Living people
American men's ice hockey left wingers
Boston Bruins players
Boston University Terriers men's ice hockey players
Detroit Vipers players
Ice hockey coaches from Rhode Island
Ice hockey players at the 1988 Winter Olympics
Ice hockey players at the 1992 Winter Olympics
Kalamazoo Wings (1974–2000) players
Minnesota North Stars players
New York Rangers draft picks
Olympic ice hockey players of the United States
Sportspeople from Providence, Rhode Island
Providence Bruins players
San Diego Barracudas players
San Diego Gulls (IHL) players
Wilkes-Barre/Scranton Penguins head coaches
AHCA Division I men's ice hockey All-Americans
Ice hockey people from Providence, Rhode Island